Mossad 101 (lit. The Seminary) is an Israeli television action drama series that premiered on Channel 2 on October 31, 2015. The series follows a fictional training course for the Israeli intelligence agency the Mossad and focuses on the humane side of its agents and their personal experiences.

It reveals different methods to track down, sort and recruit successful agents and shows the moral difficulties of this occupation.

The series became available on Netflix on 10 October 2016.

The second season premiered on 26 October 2017, initially on Israel's Channel 2, and from November 2017 on Reshet's new standalone channel, Reshet 13.

Plot
The series revolves around a secret Mossad compound called 'HaMidrasha', which is surrounded by surveillance cameras and is equipped with technological devices. The compound operates a training course in which 13 trainees are sent to complicated missions in order to test their suitability for the occupation, and their improvisation, seduction and impersonation abilities.

Yonna, the commander of the course, criticizes the mediocrity of Mossad's agents and demands from the new trainees a higher level of execution. He decides to create a new training program to test his trainees via unusual and radical situations, in which, apart from excellence, Yonna demands a creative "out of the box" thinking.

As individual trainees fail in different ways (physically, psychologically, ethically), they are unceremoniously dropped from the training program (and mostly from the show).

Cast and characters
Yehuda Levi as Yona Harari ("Kinder"): Commander of the course, a grounded Mossad agent
Liron Weismann as Avigail: Supervisor and former wife of Yona, a psychologist
Yehoram Gaon as Simon: Retired Mossad agent, was called to serve as the guide of the course
Shai Avivi as Micha: Deputy Mossad director
Aki Avni as Giora Hafner: Trainee of the course, a wealthy businessman
Itay Tiran as Avishay: Trainee of the course, body language expert
Hana Laszlo as Doris Levi: Trainee of the course
Omer Barnea as Uri Spector: Trainee of the course, born in the United States
Rom Barnea as Ziv Spector: Trainee of the course, born in the United States
Soraya Torrens as Katarina Anolyo: Trainee of the course, born in Brazil
Alex Cheqon as Max Elbaz: Trainee of the course, born in France
Dan Shapira as Hanoch Gat: Trainee of the course, a former F-16 pilot
Yaniv Biton as Kobi Frechdal ("The Persian"): Trainee of the course, born in Iran
Gal Toran as Avital Vexler: Trainee of the course, an actor
Genya Snop as Sveta Sheransky: Trainee of the course, born in Russia
Daniel Litman as Tubi Miller (season 2)
Tzachi Halevy as Liron Hariri (season 2)

Episodes

References

External links

Israeli drama television series
Israeli action television series
Espionage television series
Channel 2 (Israeli TV channel) original programming
2015 Israeli television series debuts
2016 Israeli television series endings
Television shows set in Israel
Works about the Mossad